Maria Rostyslavivna Kapnist, née Marietta Rostyslavivna Kapnist-Sirko (9 (22) March 1913 – 25 October 1993, Kyiv) was a Ukrainian actress, Honored Artist of the Ukrainian SSR (1988). During her spanning acting career (1956-1993) she played more than a hundred roles.

Early life and education 
Marietta Kapnist-Sirko was born on 9 (22) March 1913 in St. Petersburg. Her father, Count Rostyslav Kapnist, was a direct descendant of Myrhorod and Kyiv colonel of the Zaporizhian Army Vasyli Kapnist and her mother, Anastasia Baydak – a great-great-granddaughter of Zaporizhian Otaman Ivan Sirko.

Kapnist received her first vocal lessons from an Opera singer Feodor Chaliapin who was the first to draw attention at her talent during her first stage performance in a home play. 

The Kapnists lived in St. Petersburg until 1917 when they had to flee to Sudak, Crimea to escape from the revolutionary storms. In 1921, Kapnist’s father, Rostyslav, was shot by a punitive detachment of the Cheka. Soon, the Kapnists’ house in Sudak was destroyed, and the surviving family members had to go into hiding. 

In 1927, Kapnist moved to Kyiv to live with her aunt and graduated from a labor school there. Then Kapnist moved to Leningrad where she entered the theater studio of Yuri Yuriev at Leningrad Drama Theater named after Alexander Pushkin graduating in 1934.  

In 1934, when Sergei Kirov was killed, the Kapnists who were friends with Kirov were considered unreliable again. Because of her noble origin, Kapnist was expelled from the Theater Institute and was prohibited to live in Leningrad. Therefore, she was forced to return to Kyiv and later to Batumi to work as an accountant.

Repressions 
In 1937, Kapnist was arrested for the first time but soon was released. She was arrested again on 27 August 1941. Kapnist was accused of spreading anti-Soviet propaganda. She was sentenced to 8 years in labor camps according to Article 58-10 part 1 (“Propaganda and agitation calling for overthrow 

of Soviet government”). In August 1949, Kapnist was freed from Steplag and sent to Kazachin village in the Krasnoyarsk Territory.

In 1950, she gave birth to a daughter Radislava in the prison hospital Steplag in Kazakhstan, where she lived in exile and worked in coal mines. The father of her child was Jan Volkonski, a noble Polish engineer who was shot three year later after Radislava’s birth.

In 1951, Kapnist was arrested again and sentenced to 10 years in prison on charges of anti-Soviet agitation. Her 2-year-old daughter was taken from her and placed in the Esaulovsky orphanage in the Krasnoyarsk Territory. Kapnist’s friend went to Moscow and managed to get an appointment with a Soviet political figure Anastas Mikoyan to whom she complained about Kapnist’s illegal imprisonment. Through Mikoyan’s intervention, Kapnist was released in February 1956 before the end of her 10-year term (supposed to end in 1963).

Rehabilitation and career in the cinema 
After Kapnist was released she went to Moscow and then to Kyiv in the same year. She moved to live with her friend from the 1930s, Anna Pilnyak and worked as a masseuse. The same year Kapnist began acting in films, debuting in the 1956 film One Night directed by Maksym Ruf and Oleksandr Muzil. She got an appointment with the writer and academician Mykola Bazhan and with his assistance the Union of Soviet Writers of Ukraine hired Kapnist as a caretaker of one of the writers’ wife. Kapnist was rehabilitated in 1958.

Kapnist was not allowed to take her daughter Radislava as she was issued a certificate stating she has a nervous system disorder. Her daughter was adopted by a friend Valentyna Bazavluk.

By the decision of the Supreme Court of the Russian Soviet Federative Socialist Republic the sentence and all subsequent decisions in the Kapnist case were overturned and the case against her was terminated for lack of corpus delicti.

From 1960 until 1993, Kapnist worked as a full-time actress at the Dozhenko Film Studios. During this time, she has played more than a hundred roles and episodes, including Ruslan and Lyudmila, The Lost Letter, The Old Fortress, Bronze Bird, Gypsies Are Found Near Heaven, The Wild Hunt of King Stakh, Evenings on a Farm near Dikanka, Hearts of three, and many others. Kapnist became famous for her roles as old women, witches, sorceresses, gypsies and countesses. 

In 1988, Kapnist was awarded the title of Honored Artist of the Ukrainian SSR.

The documentary Maria Kapnist. Three Worlds (1989) by Ukrainian director Viktor Vasylenko is dedicated to Kapnist.

Death 

During the years spent in the labor camps where Kapnist had to work in the underground mines, she developed a claustrophobia and couldn’t use underground passages. In October 1993, she was involved in a car accident when crossing Peremohy Avenue in Kyiv near Oleksandr Dovzhenko Film Studio. Maria Kapnists died of complications after the car accident on 25 October 1993 in Oleksandr Hospital in Kyiv. She was buried in the village of Velyka Obukhivka, Myrhorod, Poltava district.

Commemoration 
In 2009, Ukrainian director Serhiy Dariychuk dedicated his documentary “Proud Tear” (2009) to Maria Kapnist.

In 2014 Ukrainian state postal service Ukrposhta issued the postage stamp #1370 “Maria Kapnist. 1914-1993. 100 years since birth". The same year a memorial plaque dedicated to Kapnist was placed on building number 13 on Vasyl Lypkivskyi 25/7 in Kyiv.

In 2018, Kyiv City Council renamed Zhelyabov Street to Maria Kapnist Street.

Filmography (selected) 

 1956 - Ivanna
 1959 - Tavriya
 1960 - Far from the Motherland
 1961 - Chasing Two Hares
 1964 - The Keys of Skies
 1965 - Shadows of Forgotten Ancestors
 1966-67 - War and Peace
 1970 - Hail, Mary!
 1971 - Olesya
 1972 - Ruslan and Ludmila
 1972 - The Lost Letter
 1972 - That Sweet Word: Liberty!
 1976 - The Blue Bird 
1976 - Gypsies Are Found Near Heaven 
 1977 - Love at First Sight
1984 - Chance
1988 - New Adventures of a Yankee in King Arthur's Court
1991 - Anna Karamazoff
1991 - Dude - Water Winner
1992 - Psychic

References 

1913 births
1993 deaths
Ukrainian film actresses
Steplag detainees
Recipients of the title of Merited Artist of Ukraine